Robert Lisovskyi (29 December 1893 – 28 December 1982) was a Ukrainian artist and graphic designer, a follower of Mykhailo Boychuk and Heorhiy Narbut. He was specializing in various forms of graphic arts, particularly printmaking, book illustration, decorative and applied arts, scenography and design.

The artist is known for his logo designs of Organization of Ukrainian Nationalists and Lufthansa's crane.

Lisovskyi was a head of the Associations of Ukrainian in Great Britain.

Biography
Lisovsky was born in a family of the director of mechanical shops in Kamianske. His mother Julia von Ander was of German descent. Robert also was baptized as Evangelical Lutheran. His elementary education, Lisovsky received in a local German school.

In 1906 Lisovsky attended Hohol Arts School in Myrhorod where he received instructions from such artists like Opanas Slastion and Latvian Rūdolfs Pelše (1880 — 1942). Later he studied at the Murashko Drawing School in Kiev (director Mykola Murashko) along with Vasyl Sedlyar, Anatol Petrytsky, Pavlo Kovzhun, and others. After that Lisovsky studied at the Ukrainian State Academy of Arts in Kyiv being taught by Mykhailo Boychuk and Heorhiy Narbut.

Exhibition of his works, Lisovsky started in 1914. In 1919 he became a member of "Musegetes" literary and art association and worked on decorations to the play "Romeo and Juliet" for the "Molodyi Teatr" (Young Theatre). Among his earlier book illustrations are a poem collection cover of M.Mocharovskyi "Above the field of curse, a love is sobbing" and a draft to a poem collection cover of Pavlo Tychyna "Sunny clarinets" (last one never was realized).

Lisovskyi also had a beautiful voice and for some time studied at conservatorium of professor Olena Muravyova and sang in choir of the academic community.

External links
 Robert Lisovskyi at Encyclopedia of History of Ukraine
 Robert Lisovsky at Encyclopedia of Ukraine
 Hoshovskyi, I., Zasiadko, M. Was the Lufthansa Logo Designed by a Ukrainian artist?. Centre for Transport Strategies. 13 July 2015

1893 births
1982 deaths
People from Kamianske
People from Yekaterinoslav Governorate
Ukrainian people of German descent
Russian Lutherans
Ukrainian graphic designers
Ukrainian illustrators
Ukrainian heraldic artists
20th-century Lutherans